The 27th Lambda Literary Awards were held on June 1, 2015, to honour works of LGBT literature published in 2014. The list of nominees was released on March 4.

The ceremony was held at Cooper Union.

Special awards

Nominees and winners

References

Lambda Literary Awards
Lambda
Lists of LGBT-related award winners and nominees
2015 in LGBT history
Lambda